Lodge School is a private school located in Kuching, Sarawak, Malaysia, established in 1953.

Lodge Group of Schools now operates under four different entities, namely:
 Lodge Kindergarten (Tadika Lodge T.1006)
 Lodge International School (Sekolah Antarabangsa Lodge SAS.1013)
 Lodge Primary School (Sekolah Rendah Lodge SRS.1008)
 Lodge Secondary School (Sekolah Menengah Lodge SMS.1020)

References 

Educational institutions established in 1953
1953 establishments in Sarawak
Malaysia–United Kingdom relations